Steine is a village in Nærøysund municipality in Trøndelag county, Norway. The village is located along the Foldafjord, just northeast of the island village of Abelvær. The Steine Chapel is located here, and it serves this area of Nærøy.

References

Villages in Trøndelag
Nærøysund
Nærøy